Bradley Field may refer to several places:

Bradley International Airport in Windsor Locks, Connecticut
Bradley Air National Guard Base, the military portion of Bradley International Airport
The baseball field at the Eastern Nazarene College in Quincy, Massachusetts